The National Rail Transportation Company (abbreviated SNTF) is Algeria's national railway operator.

History

The beginnings

The history of the railway in Algeria began with the colonisation of the country by France. The French private company Compagnie des chemins de fer algériens started working on the line with the help of the French army on 11 July 1860. Around the same time, the company obtained permission to create an Oran-Sig line and a Constantine-Skikda line. However, due to economic difficulties, only the Algiers-Blida line was finished, and it was subsequently opened to the public on 8 September 1862. Afterwards, 5 other companies started the construction of new lines:
La Compagnie Bône - Guelma (BG)
La Compagnie de l'Est Algérien (EA) (Eastern Algeria)
La Compagnie Paris - Lyon - Méditerranée (PLM)
La Compagnie de l'Ouest Algérien (OA) (Western Algeria)
La Compagnie Franco - Algérienne (FA)

Between 1857 and 1878, the following lines (or parts of them) were finished, totalling , which exceeded initial expectations:
Annaba - Berrahal
Annaba - Bouchegouf - Guelma
El Khroub - Oued Zenati
Constantine - Skikda
Constantine - Sétif
Algiers - Thénia
Algiers - Oran
Arzew - La Macta - Mohammedia
Mohammadia - Mécheria
Oued Tlélat-Sidi Bel Abbès

Nationalisation 

After 1879, France divided the railway lines being built into categories of local interest or of general interest, with only the latter being eligible to receive state funding. The 18 July 1879 decree defined the extent of some "general interest" lines and ordered the construction of a further  of railways to expand the existing network. Between 1879 to 1906, the following lines (or parts of them) were finished, totalling :
Souk Ahras—Tébessa—Le Kouif—Tunisian border
Berrahal—Ramdane Djamel
Ouled Rahmoune—Khenchela
El Guerrah—Biskra
Sétif—Thénia with further lines to include Tizi Ouzou, Béjaia and Sour El-Ghozlane
Blida—Berrouaghia
Mostaganem—Relizane—Tiaret
Oran—Arzew
Es Sénia—Aïn Témouchent
Sidi Bel Abbès—Tlemcen—Moroccan border
Tabia—Crampel
Méchéria—Béchar
Tizi—Mascara

After a while, the private companies were unable to maintain economic stability, which led the French government to buy the Franco - Algérienne, Est Algérien, Bône-Guelma and Ouest Algérien in 1900, 1908, 1905 and 1920 respectively.

On 27 September 1912, the state-owned Compagnie des Chemins de Fer Algériens de l'Etat (CFAE) assumed control of all lines, except those owned by the Compagnie Paris - Lyon - Méditerranée. On 1 July 1921, the CFAE and PLM agreed to share the Algerian railway network with the PLM operating the Algiers-Oran, Oran-Aïn Témouchent, Sidi Bel Abbès-Tlemcen-Oujda-Crampel, Blida-Hassi Bahbah lines (effectively Western Algeria) while the CFAE operated the rest.

On 30 May 1938, both companies were incorporated into the newly founded SNCF, which operated all of France's railway network, with the Algerian network becoming a région. On 1 January 1939, the Office des Chemins de fer Algériens (Office CFA) was created, focusing on the Algerian network.

On 30 June 1959, an agreement was made between the French government and the OCFA leading to the creation of the Société des Chemins de Fer Français en Algérie which commenced operations on 1 January 1, 1960. This new company operated Algeria's railways until its replacement by the Société Nationale des Chemins de Fer Algériens (SNCFA) on 16 June 1963, a year after Algeria's independence.

Post-Independence

On 30 March 1976, the SNCFA split into the following companies:
SNTF, for the operation and maintenance of the lines;
SNERIF, for the renewal and extension of the network;
SIF, for the engineering and modernisation of the infrastructure.

This reorganisation was intended to improve the railway network and services in Algeria, however it proved unsuccessful and the two latter companies were reintegrated into the SNTF.  In 1980, a convention for the relations between the Algerian state and the SNTF was signed, officially called decree N° 88-128 of 28 June 1988. This convention is still in effect and regulates the salaries of the workers and the maintenance of the infrastructure, and bears similarities with the June 1959 convention. In December 1990, the SNTF became an Établissement Public à caractère Industriel et Commercial (EPIC).

Recent investments
Large investment programs were launched after 1980 to improve the Algerian railway network, such as the construction of the Jijel-Ramdane-Djamel line, the Béni Saf area railway, providing transportation for its cement plant, and in the Saïda (23 km) and Aïn Touta areas.

Many train stations all over the country were modernised or even reconstructed, and there were also many improvements to the railways in the vicinities of Algiers and Annaba.

A new, separate organisation, Anesrif, has been created to manage infrastructure investment whilst SNTF concentrates on day-to-day operations. Anesrif has awarded a series of contracts to build new infrastructure and upgrade existing lines, including the construction of a single-track line from Relizane to Tiaret and Tissemsilt, forming part of the High Plateau line.

Rolling stock
As of 2017, SNTF's rolling stock inventory consisted of: 
 258 Locomotives
 10,129 Railway cars
 380 Passenger cars
17 Alstom Coradia - built at De Dietrich Ferroviaire plant in Reichshoffen, France
17 CAF TDMD S/599
64 Stadler Flirt

Railway links to adjacent countries 
 gauge links were built to both Morocco and Tunisia. However, the land border with Morocco has since been closed.

Affiliations
The SNTF is a member of the following organizations:
 African Union of Railways
 Arab Union of Railways
 Comité du Transport Ferroviaire Maghrebin (CTFM) (has its headquarters in Algiers)
 International Union of Railways (UIC)

See also 

 Similar gauges
 Template:Suburban railways in Africa

References and notes

External links
 
EngRailHistory The Railways of Morocco, Tunisia, and Algeria (Internet Archive)

1055 mm gauge railways in Algeria
Standard gauge railways
Algerian brands
Companies based in Algiers
Railway companies of Algeria
Rapid transit in Algeria